The orange-sided thrush or orange-banded thrush (Geokichla peronii) is a species of bird in the family Turdidae. It is found on Timor island and the southern Maluku Islands. Its natural habitats are subtropical or tropical dry forests and subtropical or tropical moist lowland forests. It is threatened by habitat loss.

References

orange-sided thrush
Birds of Timor
Birds of the Maluku Islands
orange-sided thrush
Taxa named by Louis Jean Pierre Vieillot
Taxonomy articles created by Polbot